Louis Eugene Jagnow (July 31, 1910 – March 26, 2007) was an American professional basketball player. He played in the National Basketball League for the Detroit Eagles in two games during the 1939–40 season.

References

1910 births
2007 deaths
American men's basketball players
Basketball players from Michigan
Carnegie Mellon Tartans baseball players
Carnegie Mellon Tartans men's basketball players
Detroit Eagles players
Guards (basketball)
Sportspeople from Jackson, Michigan